The Broyles Award is an annual award given to honor the best assistant coach in college football.  First awarded in 1996, it was named after former University of Arkansas men's athletic director Frank Broyles.  The award is presented in Little Rock, Arkansas at the Downtown Rotary Club. To date 18 of the 23 winners have gone on to become head football coaches.

Award 
Every year, roughly 1,300 assistant coaches representing all 130 FBS programs are eligible for nomination by their peers as well as a Selection Committee composed of former head coaches. The nominees are narrowed down to just five finalists, all of whom are invited to Little Rock, Arkansas for the annual Broyles Award ceremony. The success of the five finalists is celebrated over a two-day period, which culminates in the award ceremony. Finalists receive gifts from event sponsors and a Broyles Award finalist plaque, while the winner receives the bronze-cast trophy, valued at $5,000.

Trophy 
The Broyles Award Trophy, made out of solid bronze, depicts Broyles (kneeling) and longtime University of Arkansas assistant coach Wilson Matthews (standing), watching over a Razorbacks football game or practice.  Matthews was the coach of Little Rock Central High School before joining Broyles on the Razorbacks' staff.

Selection committee members 
The selection committee for the Frank Broyles Award includes many respected coaches from around the nation.  The list of current committee members is as follows:

Vince Dooley
Grant Teaff
Barry Switzer
Bobby Bowden
Lou Holtz
John Robinson
Urban Meyer
Jim Donnan
Mike Bellotti
R. C. Slocum
Frank Beamer
Gary Pinkel
Steve Spurrier
Bob Stoops
Bill Snyder
Mark Richt
Phillip Fulmer

Broadcast Selection Committee Members 
The list of current Broadcast Selection Committee Members is as follows:

Maria Taylor (sportscaster)
Desmond Howard

Winners 
Note: The award year indicates the season it was earned.

References

External links 
Official website

+
Awards established in 1996